Smile is a 2017 novel by Irish author Roddy Doyle.

Plot

Reception
The New Statesman said "Smile is a Trojan Horse. The tale of how a man got on with his life after an abusive childhood, in part by laughing at it, is a disguise: Doyle’s tactic is to puncture the comedy of Irish storytelling and show that it can camouflage horrific histories. Doyle is one of the best writers of dialogue we have, using it with humour and drama."

References

2017 Irish novels
Novels by Roddy Doyle
Jonathan Cape books